Union is a village in McHenry County, Illinois, United States. The population was 551 at the 2020 census.

History
A post office called Union has been in operation since 1852. The village was named for the federal union of the United States.

Geography
Union is located in southwestern McHenry County at  (42.235237, -88.542379).

The village drains to the north toward the South Branch of the Kishwaukee River, part of the Rock River watershed.

Demographics

At the 2000 census there were 576 people, 204 households, and 158 families living in the village. The racial makeup of the village was 98.09% White, 0.35% Native American, 0.87% from other races, and 0.69% from two or more races. Hispanic or Latino of any race were 3.99%.

Of the 204 households 37.7% had children under the age of 18 living with them, 63.7% were married couples living together, 9.3% had a female householder with no husband present, and 22.5% were non-families. 15.7% of households were one person and 6.4% were one person aged 65 or older. The average household size was 2.82 and the average family size was 3.15.

The age distribution was 28.0% under the age of 18, 7.5% from 18 to 24, 34.2% from 25 to 44, 19.3% from 45 to 64, and 11.1% 65 or older. The median age was 36 years. For every 100 females, there were 92.6 males. For every 100 females age 18 and over, there were 97.6 males.

The median household income was $56,528 and the median family income  was $57,500. Males had a median income of $38,393 versus $25,536 for females. The per capita income for the village was $21,218. About 5.8% of families and 5.2% of the population were below the poverty line, including 2.9% of those under age 18 and 16.7% of those age 65 or over.

Points of interest
Union was the site of the world's first fully automatic electrical substation, on the current site of the water tower just east of Main Street.

Union is home to the Illinois Railway Museum and the McHenry County Historical Society. It was formerly the home of Donley's Wild West Town amusement park, now closed.

Notable person

 Red Kelly, right fielder for the Chicago White Sox; born in Union

Media
The Marengo-Union Times is the newspaper of record in Union; it has a circulation of 6,300 and is mailed to every home and business in the greater Marengo and Union area. For cable television, Union is served by Charter Communications instead of Comcast, like the rest of the Chicago Metropolitan Area.

References

External links 
Marengo-Union Times local newspaper website

Villages in McHenry County, Illinois
Villages in Illinois
Chicago metropolitan area